Uhehlia pardalis is a species of leaf beetle of East Africa and the Democratic Republic of the Congo. It was first described from Uhehe, a region now in Tanzania, by Julius Weise in 1906.

References

Eumolpinae
Beetles of the Democratic Republic of the Congo
Taxa named by Julius Weise
Beetles described in 1906
Insects of East Africa